Maryna Gąsienica-Daniel (born 19 February 1994) is a World Cup alpine ski racer from Poland. She competed for Poland at the 2014 Winter Olympics in the alpine skiing events, and was 32nd in the giant slalom. She finished 34th in the giant slalom at the World Championships in 2013, and won a gold medal in giant slalom at the 2013 Winter Universiade. She is the sister of alpine racer Agnieszka Gąsienica-Daniel.

World Cup results

World Championship results

Olympic results

Europa Cup results

Race victories

References

External links

1994 births
Living people
Olympic alpine skiers of Poland
Alpine skiers at the 2014 Winter Olympics
Alpine skiers at the 2018 Winter Olympics
Alpine skiers at the 2022 Winter Olympics
Polish female alpine skiers
Universiade medalists in alpine skiing
Sportspeople from Zakopane
Universiade gold medalists for Poland
Competitors at the 2013 Winter Universiade
21st-century Polish women